Teluk Intan Municipal Council, formerly known as the Hilir Perak District Council from 1 December 1979 until 22 April 2003, is the local authority which administers Teluk Intan, the capital of Hilir Perak District. This agency is under the purview of Perak state government.

Departments
Administration
Property Valuation & Management
Licensing
Engineering
Town Services
Law
Enforcement
OSC Unit
Treasury

References

External links
 

Local government in Perak
Teluk Intan